Juliao Monteiro (born 17 July 1993), is a football player who currently plays as goalkeeper for Timor-Leste national football team.

International career
Juliao made his senior international debut in a 7-0 loss against Saudi Arabia national football team in the 2018 FIFA World Cup qualification on 3 September 2015.

References

External links
 

1993 births
Living people
East Timorese footballers
Timor-Leste international footballers
Association football goalkeepers
Footballers at the 2014 Asian Games
Asian Games competitors for East Timor